Kachua is an upazila of Bagerhat District in the Division of Khulna, Bangladesh. Distance from the zilla sodor is 16 km. Kachua Thana was turned into an upazila in 1983.

Geography
It has 18,553 households and a total area of 131.62 km2.

Kachua Upazila, with an area of 131.62 km2, is bordered by Chitalmari Upazila on the north, Nazirpur and Pirojpur Sadar Upazilas on the east, Bagerhat Sadar Upazila on the west and Morrelganj Upazila on the south. The main rivers are Baleshwar, Bhairab and Bishkhali.

Demographics
According to the 2011 Bangladesh census, Kachua had a population of 97011. Males constituted 49.251% (47,778) of the population, and females 50.749% (49,233). The population aged 18 or over was 33675(M), 33677(F). Kachua had an average literacy rate of 61.5% (7+ years), compared to the national average of 32.4%.

76.39% of the population are Muslim, 23.58% are Hindu and 0.03% follow other religions.

Arts and culture
CULTURE: KACHUA public library, a theatre group, 20+ rural clubs and 34 women's organizations.

Points of interest 
Moghia raj bari (royal maghiya house, kings lived here before). The raj bari is nearly damaged but still visite worthy. However, people came to visit here from different places.

There is a raj temple. This royal temple used to worship gods and kings before. Here, Kali, Shyama, and the newly- week worship were. The Hindu people village still has people worship different gods dedabira.

Punno Sanan (borunir bath) is a great occasion of fair. Every year more than 50,000 people attand this religious fair.

Archaeological heritage Shibpur Shivabari (1300 AD).

Historical events during the War of Liberation (1971) the Razakars killed 42 innocent people at Shakharikathi Hat of Badhal Union.

Mark of the War of Liberation - mass grave 7, memorial 2.

Administration
Kachua Upazila is divided into seven union parishads: Badhal, Dhopakhali, Gazalia, Gopalpur, Kachua, Maghia, and Raripara. The union parishads are subdivided into 77 mauzas and 98 villages.

Education
Literacy rate and educational institutions Average literacy 42.5%; male 47.5%, female 37.3%. Educational institutions: college 2, high school 16, madrasa 8, government primary school 48, non-government primary school 42. Notable institutions: Goalmath Rashikpal High School (1916) and Baraikhali Government Primary School (1918).

Notable people
 Abdul Jabbar Jahanabadi

References

 
Upazilas of Bagerhat District